Scandal! (formerly The Voice) is a South African soap opera produced by Ochre Moving Pictures and broadcast on e.tv. It is one of the most watched soapies in South Africa, contending with SABC 1's longest-running soapie Generations: The Legacy. It is also broadcast across Africa on the eAfrica, e.tv Botswana and e.tv Ghana feeds.

Plot 

Scandal! is set at the fictional media company Nyathi Family Holdings (NFH) based in Newtown, Johannesburg, which produces the newspaper The Voice and the gossip magazine, Scandal. It follows the lives of the people and families working at NFH magazine as well as other characters in the show. It also tells the story of socioeconomic divides set in a local township of Soweto and the Johannesburg suburb Newtown, where NFH is based, while looking at the private desires of the high-classes and making ends meet of the lower-class.

Current cast
As shown on opening scene
Mapaseka Koetle -Nyokong
Melusi Mbele
Nolwazi Ngubeni
Kagiso Rathebe
Matthews Rantsoma
James Kgaugelo Sithole
Johanna M. Marokane
Boikarabelo M. Mabuza
Fundiswa Ngcobo

Current Cast and Characters

Former cast
Clint Brink as Valentino "Tino" Martens
 Lusanda Mbane as Boniswa Langa 
Candice Derman as Samantha
Lorcia Cooper as Erin Martens
Hlomla Dandala as Kingsley Siseko Langa
Luthuli Dlamini as Stan Nyathi
Avile Bantwini as Eric Stein 
Hungani Ndlovu as Romeo Medupe
Sello Maake Ka-Ncube as Lucas "Daniel" Nyathi
Bongile Mantsai as Mthunzi Mayiza
Mothusi Magano as Phehello Mokheti / The Dustbin Man
Dawn Matthews as Shakira Nyathi (née Kane)
Masasa Mbangeni as Thembeka Shezi - Nyathi
Kagiso Modupe as Mangaliso "Mangi" Nyathi
Sandy Mokwena as Bra Eddie Khumalo
Nthati Moshesh as Morongwe "Mo" Molefe
Masechaba Gloria Moshoe-Shoe as Mmadika Molefe
Fulu Mugovhani as Anzani Chabedi
Nolwazi Ngubeni as Mbali Kubeka
Patrick Mofokeng as Mlungisi Ngema
 Sihle Ndaba as Dudu Kubheka
Siyabonga Shibe as Kila Ngcobo
Getmore Sithole as Cain Gumede / Daniel Nyathi
Petronella Tshuma  as Ruby
Khulu Skenjana as Gorbachev
Mthunzi Ntoyi as Sijo
Soso Rungqu as Kagiso
Sma Mathibeli as Nomcebo
Simo Magwaza as Mamba
Sandile Mahlangu as Simo Shabangu
Cindy Mahlangu as Violet Mamba
Nomvelo Makhanya as Lindiwe Ngema - Maseko
Thuso Mbedu as Kitso Medupe 
Botlhale Boikanyo as Omphile
Nolo Seabi as Seipatiu
Sources:

References

External links 
 

South African drama television series
E.tv original programming